Mylothris poppea, the Poppea dotted border, is a butterfly in the family Pieridae. It is found in Guinea, Sierra Leone, Liberia, Ivory Coast, Ghana and Togo. The habitat consists of forests, penetrating riverine and drier forest areas.

The larvae feed on Loranthaceae species.

References

Butterflies described in 1777
Pierini